Clifford Collinson (3 March 1920 – September 1990) was an English footballer who played as a goalkeeper for Manchester United during the 1946–47 season.

Born in Middlesbrough, in north-east England, Collinson was spotted playing for Urmston Boys Club towards the end of the Second World War and joined Manchester United as an amateur in May 1946. He turned professional in September 1946, before making his debut for the club in a scoreless draw away to Aston Villa on 2 November 1946. He went on a run of seven consecutive games, culminating with a 2–1 defeat to Blackburn Rovers at Ewood Park on 14 December 1946. However, he was not able to claim the "number one" jersey from Jack Crompton on a regular basis and never played for the club again.

External links
Profile at StretfordEnd.co.uk
Profile at MUFCInfo.com

1920 births
1990 deaths
Footballers from Middlesbrough
English footballers
Association football goalkeepers
Manchester United F.C. players
English Football League players